Psalm 54 is the 54th psalm of the Book of Psalms, beginning in English in the King James Version: "Save me, O God, by thy name, and judge me by thy strength". In the slightly different numbering system used in the Greek Septuagint and Latin Vulgate translations of the Bible, this psalm is Psalm 53. In Latin, it is known as "Deus in nomine tuo salvum me fac",  Attributed to David, it was written for one who finds oneself betrayed by a friend.

The psalm forms a regular part of Jewish, Catholic, Eastern Orthodox and Protestant liturgies.

Text

Hebrew Bible version
Following is the Hebrew text of Psalm 54:

King James Version
The following is the full English text of the Psalm from the King James Bible.
(To the chief Musician on Neginoth, Maschil, A Psalm of David,
when the Ziphims came and said to Saul, Doth not David hide himself with us?)
 Save me, O God, by thy name, and judge me by thy strength.
 Hear my prayer, O God; give ear to the words of my mouth.
 For strangers are risen up against me, and oppressors seek after my soul: they have not set God before them. Selah.
 Behold, God is mine helper: the Lord is with them that uphold my soul.
 He shall reward evil unto mine enemies: cut them off in thy truth.
 I will freely sacrifice unto thee: I will praise thy name, O LORD; for it is good.
 For he hath delivered me out of all trouble: and mine eye hath seen his desire upon mine enemies.

Verse numbering
Verses 1 and 2 in the Hebrew Bible correspond to the designation in English translations:
 To the chief Musician on Neginoth, Maschil, A Psalm of David,
 when the Ziphims came and said to Saul, Doth not David hide himself with us? (KJV)
Verses 1–7 in English versions correspond to verses 3–9 in the Hebrew text.

The Ziphims lived in the wilderness of Ziph, a district to the south-east of Hebron in the Judean mountains.

Commentary
It is considered one of the psalms containing prayers against false accusations, linked with an ordeal, the taking of an oath, or an appeal to the 'higher court', as indicated in the following points:
 The phrase 'vindicate me' (verse 1)
 A royal perspective of opponents as 'strangers' (verse 3; the New Revised Standard Version amends to 'the insolent'), 'the ruthless' (verse 3), and 'enemies' (verse 5)
A prayer before battle appealing to God as personal savior with a covenant 'faithfulness' (verse 5). 
It can also be described as a lament, prayer, or complaint of an individual.

Verses 1-3 pray for help and answer. Following an appeal (verses 1–2), the psalmist describes the danger facing him (verse 3), but maintains his confidence in God. In the second half of the psalm (verses 4–7), the poet, in the certainty of being heard, rejoices in help, and makes a vow of thanksgiving, he promises to sacrifice a free-will offering to express 'the voluntary gratitude of a thankful heart' (verses 6–7, another example of the 'certainty of hearing').

Book of Common Prayer
In the Church of England's Book of Common Prayer, this psalm is appointed to be read on the evening of the tenth day of the month.

The Psalm is a Proper Psalm for Good Friday.

Uses

Musical settings 
Heinrich Schütz set Psalm 54 in a metred version in German, "Hilf mir, Gott, durch den Namen dein", SWV 151, as part of the Becker Psalter, first published in 1628. Alan Hovhaness set text from this Psalm and from Psalms 55 and 56 in his choral work Make a Joyful Noise.

References

External links 

 
 
 Text of Psalm 54 according to the 1928 Psalter
 Psalms Chapter 54 text in Hebrew and English, mechon-mamre.org
 For the leader. On stringed instruments. A maskil of David, 2when the Ziphites came and said to Saul, “David is hiding among us.” Oh God, by your name save me. text and footnotes, usccb.org United States Conference of Catholic Bishops
 Psalm 54:1 introduction and text, biblestudytools.com
 Psalm 54 – Help When Abandoned and Betrayed enduringword.com
 Psalm 54 / Refrain: Behold, God is my helper. Church of England
 Psalm 54 at biblegateway.com
 Hymns for Psalm 54 hymnary.org

054
Works attributed to David